Alexandra Margo Sholler (born 27 September 1986), known professionally as Alison Wonderland, is an Australian electronic dance music producer, DJ, and singer. Her debut album, Run, was released on 20 March 2015, which peaked at No. 6 on the ARIA Albums Chart and was certified gold by ARIA. Her second album, Awake, debuted at No. 1 on Billboard's Top Dance/Electronic Albums. She was listed at No. 96 on DJ Mags Top 100 DJs in October 2018. She is also the highest billed female DJ in Coachella history. Outside of being well-known for her music, she is outspoken about her support for mental health and frequently shares her experiences with her fans.

Personal life

Early years 
Alison Wonderland was born as Alexandra Sholler in 1986. She is of Croatian descent. She grew up in Sydney where she trained as a classical musician, specialising in cello. She performed as a cellist with the Sydney Youth Opera and was later a bass guitarist in a few local indie rock bands.

Wonderland later recalled how she developed an interest in electronic dance music, "I went out to a club called Candy's Apartment... Someone played 'Silent Shout' by the Knife... I remember just completely zoning out... and walking over to the DJ and asking, 'What is this track?! Please tell someone what this track is, because this is amazing'." Her performance name is a pun to the Lewis Carroll novel Alice in Wonderland.

On March 15, 2023, she announced on Instagram that she is pregnant with her first child.

Mental health 
In 2018, Alison Wonderland revealed that she had been battling depression and suicidal thoughts, caused by an abusive relationship. She had completely lost her appetite for food and social interaction with others, and attempted suicide at one point. Writing the lyrics for her 2017 album Awake was therapeutic. In 2019, she decided to cancel multiple shows in Europe to focus on her mental health after consulting her managers and personal doctors, with overwhelming support from both numerous fellow DJs, EDM artists and fans alike.

Career

2012–2013: Remixing and performing 
During 2012 she worked as a remixer on Sam Sparro's "I Wish I Never Met You", which appeared as a bonus track on that artist's Japanese version of his second album, Return to Paradise (June 2012). Sneha Dave of Music Feeds observed, "[she] proves once again why she's becoming somewhat of a remix authority. Recently played by none other than Pete Tong on BBC Radio 1, [her] rendition perfectly complements Sparro's creamy vocals. Infused with a deep house sensibility, yet imprinted with original flair, this arrangement depicts exactly what a good remix should be – a tribute to the original."

Also in 2012 Wonderland toured with the Parklife Music Festival, visiting Australian city parks in September to October. Her set list included her remixes, Sparro's "I Wish I Never Met You" and Ladyhawke's "Blue Eyes (Alison Wonderland Remix)". Highlights were presented by Falcona on Vimeo, where she was also interviewed by the Bondi Whispers. Purple Sneakers Lauren Payne noticed, Wonderland's version of "Blue Eyes" is "a very digital remix of Ladyhawke's catchy new single. Swapping the guitar and drums for a more electronic vibe, [Wonderland] has make some techno tweaks to the single and the end product is, in true [Wonderland] style, just plain splendiferous!"

2013–2014: "Get Ready" to Calm Down 
Alison Wonderland released her debut single, "Get Ready" (featuring Fishing), in July 2013. The track was co-written by Sholler with Russell Fitzgibbon, Brendan Picchio and Douglas Wright. Fitzgibbon and Wright perform as a house music duo, Fishing. She was signed to EMI Music Australia in 2014, which is part of Universal Music Australia. As a DJ, she embarked on a national tour playing in warehouses.

On 27 June 2014 her five-track debut extended play, Calm Down, was released. It provided two singles, "I Want U" (May) and "Cold". "I Want U", which was co-written by Sholler with Andrew Swanson (a.k.a. Djemba Djemba), peaked at No. 38 on the ARIA Singles Chart, and was certified gold by ARIA in 2016. It topped the Hype Machine charts as her biggest hit to that time.

2015–2016: Run to "Messiah" 
In February 2015, Wonderland released "U Don't Know" which featured Wayne Coyne from the Flaming Lips on guest vocals. The music video gained popularity due to Christopher Mintz-Plasse's lead role alongside Wonderland. "U Don't Know" peaked at No. 63 on the ARIA Singles Chart. In March, Wonderland released her debut studio album Run.  For the album Wonderland used fellow Australian artists, Slumberjack and SAFIA as well as various producers, Djemba Djemba, Awe, and Lido. It peaked at No. 6 in Australia and No. 12 in New Zealand. K Spence from YourEDM.com praised the album due to its diversity and her involvement in the album, as she was credited as a writer, vocalist and producer. The title track was issued as a single on 11 June, along with its music video. The music video peaked at No. 6 in Australia which made it her biggest hit to date. "Run" had over two-million streams on Spotify as of 20 January 2016.

On 4 August 2015 a video for the album track "Take It to Reality" featuring SAFIA was released On 4 September 2015 Run was released in the United Kingdom. The third and final single, "Games", was issued on 9 September, and was praised by Spence for its lack of trap elements, in which most of Wonderland's music incorporates. The music video was released on the same day and was a one-take scene of Wonderland performing many sports including Grid Iron, Martial Arts and Chess. A deluxe edition of Run was released on 30 October, which included remixes of the singles, "U Don't Know", "I Want U", "Games", "Run" and "Get Ready".

Alison Wonderland was nominated for in two categories at the ARIA Music Awards of 2015, Best Dance Release for the single, "Run"; and Best Video for "U Don't Know" featuring Wayne Coyne. The latter was in a category that was publicly voted. She was one of eight nominees to gain exactly two nominations.

Her song "Run" was listed on Triple J Hottest 100, 2015 at No. 59. On 6 February 2016 she previewed a track, "Messiah", at a show, which incorporated more pop elements compared to her earlier material. It was released as a single late in 2016 with Australian hip-hop producer, M-Phazes.

2017–2019: "Happy Place" to Awake 
On 22 September 2017 Alison Wonderland was named New Artist of the Year at the Electronic Music Awards. On 21 October 2017 she was ranked No. 89 on British magazine, DJ Mags Top 100 DJs list. On 9 November 2017 she released a track, "Happy Place", ahead of her second album, Awake. Kat Bein of Billboard felt, "[it] purposely plays on the wild ups and downs of mental illness. It opens with airy strings and grounding chimes as Wonderland sings about her struggles to remain in sunny spaces. Tensions grows as the build leads to a jungle gym of clashing noise, landing in one of Wonderland's wildest creations to date." Towards the end of 2017, Alison Wonderland embarked on the "Wonderland Scarehouse Project" local tour, a warehouse show tour through Brisbane, Melbourne, Sydney, and Auckland with support from Lido, Lunice, Party Favor, and A$AP Ferg among others.

On April 6, 2018, Alison Wonderland released her second studio album titled Awake, which debut at #1 on the Billboard Dance/Electronic charts in the USA. That same week she played at Coachella on the Sahara stage, billed as the highest female DJ to date.

In 2019 Alison Wonderland toured extensively in the USA, Europe and Australasia, This included headline slots in at huge festivals like EDC Las Vegas and selling out venues like Red Rocks in Colorado 2 times. She was given an honorable mention in the 2019 Forbes list of richest DJs, the first time for a female.

2020–present: Loner 
She is profiled in the 2020 documentary film Underplayed.

On 23 September 2020, Wonderland released "Bad Things", the first single from her third studio album, Loner, which was released on 6 May 2022.

Discography

Studio albums

Extended plays

Singles

As lead artist

As featured artist

Remixes
2012
 Ladyhawke: "Blue Eyes"
 360: "Boys Like You"
 Little Dragon: "Shuffle a Dream"

2014
 Crooked Colours: "Come Down"

2015
 Duke Dumont: "Ocean Drive"
 Hermitude: "The Buzz"
 Justin Bieber: "What Do You Mean?"

2017
 Lido: "Crazy"
 Dua Lipa: "New Rules"

Awards and nominations

See also

List of female electronic musicians

References

External links

 

Australian women pop singers
Living people
21st-century Australian singers
Musicians from Sydney
DJs from Sydney
Trap musicians (EDM)
EMI Records artists
Australian electronic musicians
Trip hop musicians
Australian DJs
Women DJs
Australian record producers
Australian cellists
1986 births
Future bass musicians
Electronic dance music DJs
Electropop musicians
21st-century Australian women singers
Australian women record producers
Chillwave musicians
Australian women in electronic music
Australian people of Croatian descent